Jake Ryan (born 1992), is a linebacker for the Green Bay Packers

Jake Ryan may also refer to:

Jake Ryan (actor) (born 1983), Australian actor
Jake Ryan (Hannah Montana), a character in Hannah Montana media, played by Cody Linley
Jake Ryan (Sixteen Candles), a character in the film Sixteen Candles, played by Michael Schoeffling
Jake Edward Ryan, a Citizens for Constitutional Freedom militant in the occupation of the Malheur National Wildlife Refuge
Jake Ryan, actor in the 2021 American TV series Chad and the 2012 Wes Anderson movie Moonrise Kingdom
Jake Ryan, former drummer in the American metalcore band The Chariot